Ambaye is a small village in Ratnagiri district, Maharashtra state in Western India. The 2011 Census of India recorded a total of 1,686 residents in the village.

The main deity in this village is Shri Bhairi Koteshwari Manai Zolai Kalkai.

References

Villages in Ratnagiri district